Thomas McMillan may refer to:

 Thomas McMillan (Ontario politician) (1864–1932), Canadian politician and farmer
 Thomas McMillan (Canadian politician) (born 1945), Canadian politician and political scientist
 Thomas McMillan (British politician) (1919–1980), British MP for Glasgow Central 1966–1980
 Thomas McMillan (footballer) (1866–1928), Scottish footballer
 Thomas McMillan (golfer) offered/won 1774 Silver Cup for competition at Musselburgh, East Lothian
 Thomas S. McMillan (1888–1939), American Representative in the U.S. House from South Carolina
 Tom McMillan (baseball) (born 1951), baseball player
 Tommy McMillan (baseball) (1888–1966), baseball player
 Tommy McMillan (footballer, born 1936), Scottish footballer (Watford FC, Carlisle United FC)
 Tommy McMillan (footballer, born 1944), Scottish footballer (Aberdeen FC)

See also
 Thomas McMillen (disambiguation)
 Thomas C. MacMillan (born 1948), Canadian businessman
 Thomas C. MacMillan (politician) (1850–1935), American politician